Barkūniškis (formerly Bartkūniškis) is a village in Kėdainiai district municipality, in Kaunas County, in central Lithuania. According to the 2011 census, the village had a population of 55 people. There is a former watermill, which was a part of Barkūniškis manor (it belonged to the Kušleikos, later to the Jacunskai families).

Demography

Images

References

Villages in Kaunas County
Kėdainiai District Municipality